Hopedale Airport  is  west of Hopedale, Newfoundland and Labrador, Canada.

The airport was built in the 1960s to provide air support for Hopedale Air Station, a USAF station. After the US military left in 1968, the airport became a civilian airfield.

Facilities

A large pre-fabricated building acts as a terminal building, but there are no other structures and the airfield.

Fuel cans litter the airfield and snow plow blades are store outside on the tarmac.

There is no FBO at the airfield, thus no fuel available for aircraft landing at the airport. There is no control tower at the airport, so radio communication is made with Halifax Radio (Flight service station) and ATC is supported by Gander Centre.

Airlines and destinations

All commercial flights out of Hopedale Airport are operated by de Havilland DHC-6 Twin Otter 19-seat aircraft.

References

External links
Page about this airport on COPA's Places to Fly airport directory

Certified airports in Newfoundland and Labrador